Mewstone is an unpopulated island, composed of muscovite granite, located close to the south coast of Tasmania, Australia. Mewstone comprises part of the Southwest National Park and the Tasmanian Wilderness World Heritage Site.

Mewstone has abundant bird life and has been identified by BirdLife International as an Important Bird Area (IBA) because it supports over 1% of the world populations of shy albatrosses and fairy prions.

Etymology
In 1642 it was described by Abel Tasman, who said it "resembles a lion". The Great Mewstone got its name from the old English name for the herring gull; mew.

Although it is sometimes referred to as Mewstone Island or The Mewstone, its official name is simply Mewstone.

Flora and fauna
There is very little flora due to the rocky nature of the island. What little plant life there is grows in crevices in the rocks where soil has accumulated.

Recorded breeding seabirds include fairy prion (20,000 pairs), silver gull, black-faced cormorant and shy albatross (7,500 pairs).  Mewstone is the largest of only three shy albatross breeding colonies in the world, the other two being Albatross Island and Pedra Branca.  Australian fur seals haul-out on small ledges.  The Tasmanian tree skink is also present.

See also

 List of islands of Tasmania
 South East Cape
 South West Cape

References

External links
Mewstone viewed from the south

Islands of South West Tasmania
Protected areas of Tasmania
Important Bird Areas of Tasmania